North Yorkshire County Council was elected every four years until 2017, and then in 2022.  The council will be abolished on 31 March 2023.

Political control
Political control has been exercised as follows:

Leadership
The leaders of the council since 2001 have been:

Council elections
There was no election in 2021 because of proposals to abolish the county council.  Councillors elected in 2022 will serve as county councillors until April 2023, and will then serve as councillors for the new unitary North Yorkshire Council.
2001 North Yorkshire County Council election
2005 North Yorkshire County Council election
2009 North Yorkshire County Council election
2013 North Yorkshire County Council election
2017 North Yorkshire County Council election
2022 North Yorkshire Council election

County result maps

By-election results
The following is an incomplete list of by-elections to North Yorkshire County Council.

2001-2005

By-election following death of Denis Pedder.

2009-2013

By-election following resignation of Ron Haigh.

By-election following resignation of Melva Steckles.

2013-2017

By-election following death of Margaret Hulme.

By-election following death of Polly English.

By-election following death of Tony Hall.

2017–2022

By-election following resignation of Nicola Faris.

By-election following death of John Blackie.

By-election following death of Geoff Webber.

By-election following death of Richard Welch.

2022–2023

By-election following death of Margaret Atkinson.

References

External links
North Yorkshire County Council

 
Council elections in North Yorkshire
County council elections in England